The Soviet Union women's national under-20 volleyball team represents Soviet Union in international women's volleyball competitions and friendly matches under the age 20 and it was ruled by the Soviet Volleyball Federation That was a member of The Federation of International Volleyball FIVB and also a part of The European Volleyball Confederation CEV.

Results

FIVB U20 World Championship
 Champions   Runners up   Third place   Fourth place

Europe U19 Championship
 Champions   Runners up   Third place   Fourth place

Team

Current squad

References

External links
 Official website 

National women's under-20 volleyball teams
Soviet Union national volleyball team
Volleyball in the Soviet Union